Lunda Sharif is a town and union council of Dera Ismail Khan District in Khyber Pakhtunkhwa province of Pakistan. It is located at 31°39'41N 70°46'7E and has an altitude of 157 metres (518 feet).

References

Union councils of Dera Ismail Khan District
Populated places in Dera Ismail Khan District